Samuel Parker (1872 – unknown) was a Scottish footballer. His regular position was as a forward. He was born in Hurlford. He played for Hurlford, Burnley, and Manchester United.

External links
MUFCInfo.com profile

1872 births
Scottish footballers
Burnley F.C. players
Manchester United F.C. players
Year of death missing
Date of birth missing
Hurlford United F.C. players
People from Ayrshire
Association football forwards